NHL 2K8 is an ice hockey video game made by 2K Sports, and published on the PlayStation 2, PlayStation 3, and Xbox 360 consoles. It features former Ottawa Senators centre Jason Spezza on its cover. Bob Cole and Harry Neale return from NHL 2K6 and NHL 2K7 to provide commentary.

New features in the game include an all-new faceoff system, an all-new ProStick system involving the right skill stick to deke, take faceoffs and puck handle, and an all-new system called Superstar Combo moves, which mimics real-life dekes and fakes by actual NHL players to use in the game with the push of a button. Also, the game included an all-new goaltending system, with all-new graphics and movement.

NHL 2K8 introduced the new Reebok Edge jerseys through the use of a code found on the 2K Sports website.

The soundtrack has 16 rock songs from various artists including Priestess, Comeback Kid, Stellastarr, and other rock bands.

Reception

The game received "average" reviews on all platforms according to the review aggregation website Metacritic.

See also
NHL 2K

References

External links

Official Website

2K Sports games
08
Ice hockey video games
Xbox 360 games
PlayStation 2 games
PlayStation 3 games
2007 video games
Video games developed in the United States
Video games set in 2007
Video games set in 2008
Take-Two Interactive games